Sigmoid means resembling the lower-case Greek letter sigma (uppercase Σ, lowercase σ, lowercase in word-final position ς) or the Latin letter S.  Specific uses include:

 Sigmoid function, a mathematical function
 Sigmoid colon, part of the large intestine or colon
 Sigmoid sinus, two structures that drain blood from the bottom of the brain
 Sigmoid arteries, a pair/trio of arteries in the lower abdomen

See also 
 Ogee, similar shape, term sometimes used for sigmoids